Outback Ringer is an Australian factual television series. It follows workers who retrieve feral cattle. The first season of ten episodes was first broadcast in 2020 on the ABC.

See also
 Outback Wrangler

References

External links
 
 

2020 Australian television series debuts
Australian Broadcasting Corporation original programming
Australian factual television series
English-language television shows
Nine Network original programming
Television shows set in the Outback